Black River is a  river in Alcona County in the U.S. state of Michigan.

A large portion of its drainage basin is known as the Black River Swamp.

Tributaries (from the mouth):
 North Branch Black River
 Potvin Lake
 Gauthier Creek
 DeRocher Creek
 Butternut Creek
 Liston Creek
 Silver Creek
 Haynes Creek

During the lumber boom, the town was formerly the local headquarters for Russell A. Alger's lumber company.  The house on Lake Shore Road (just north of the bridge on the west side) was removed in 2009; although Alger Street runs adjacent to the river.

References 

Rivers of Michigan
Rivers of Alcona County, Michigan
Tributaries of Lake Huron